The 2011 Sultan of Johor Cup was the first edition of the Sultan of Johor Cup. It was held in Johor Bahru, Johor, Malaysia from 5 to 12 November 2011.

Malaysia defeated Australia 3–2 through golden goal after being tied 2–2 in the final match to win the cup.

Participating nations
Six countries participated in this year's tournament:

 (Host)

Results
All times are in Malaysia Standard Time (UTC+08:00).

Preliminary round

Classification round

Fifth place game

Third place game

Final

Final standings

See also
2011 Sultan Azlan Shah Cup

References

External links
Official website

Sultan of Johor Cup
Sultan of Johor Cup
Sultan of Johor Cup
Sultan of Johor Cup
Sultan of Johor Cup